Benbradagh is a mountain in Dungiven County Londonderry, Northern Ireland. It is the second most northerly summit in the Sperrin Mountains area and the 564th highest summit in Ireland. It was used from the 1940s to the early 1970s as a United States Military Base. Col Buckley, of the Directorate of Military Intelligence (Ireland), believed nuclear weapons could be situated at underground facilities inside Benbradagh mountain in Derry, which US forces used as a communications hub in order to communicate with its North Atlantic fleet, but which were also designed for the storage of conventional high explosives. Col Buckley complained that he did not have "the monitoring or surveillance systems" to confirm the presence of nuclear weapons in Northern Ireland, but that the British strongly denied land-based systems in the territory and refused to confirm the movements of air and sea-based nuclear weapons. It is popular with paragliders due to the steep terrain. The mountain is accessible via the Curragh Road which stops near the summit.

Benbradagh is also the name of a district electoral area centred in Dungiven which is part of the Causeway Coast and Glens Borough Council

References

Mountains and hills of County Londonderry
Marilyns of Northern Ireland